The Château de Mareuil is a château in Mareuil-sur-Belle, Dordogne, Nouvelle-Aquitaine, France.

References

Châteaux in Dordogne
Monuments historiques of Dordogne